Revista de Occidente (Spanish: Magazine of the West) is a cultural magazine which has been in circulation since 1923 with some interruptions. It is based in Madrid, Spain, and is known for its founder, José Ortega y Gasset, a Spanish philosopher.

History and profile
Revista de Occidente was established by José Ortega y Gasset in 1923. Initially its publisher was a company with the same name which was also founded by Gasset. The  magazine is published by the Jose Ortega y Gasset Foundation based in Madrid on a monthly basis.

From 1923 to 1936 the editor of the magazine was José Martínez Ruiz. During this period the major contributors were Rosa Chacel, Ramiro Ledesma and Federico García Lorca. Through the magazine José Ortega y Gasset laid the foundations of his approach on modernism. The magazine also featured articles on the acceptance of modernism in Spain. 

The magazine played a significant role in providing a platform for the young avant-garde artists and writers belonging to the Generation of '27, including Maruja Mallo. Federico García Lorca first published some of his poems in Revista de Occidente. Victoria Ocampo published the first article in Spanish on Virginia Woolf and her book entitled A Room of One’s Own in the magazine in 1934. However, the magazine did not only published literary work, but also covered articles about many distinct disciplines, including paleontology. In the early 1930s it adopted a liberal political stance.

Revista de Occidente ceased publication in 1936 when the civil war began and also, its contributor Federico García Lorca died. After a long hiatus the magazine was restarted in 1963. It was not published in the period 1977–1980. It was relaunched by Soledad Ortega Spottorno, daughter of José Ortega y Gasset, in 1980. It mostly features articles on humanities and social sciences as well as interviews.

References

External links

1923 establishments in Spain
José Ortega y Gasset
Literary magazines published in Spain
Magazines established in 1923
Magazines published in Madrid
Modernism
Monthly magazines published in Spain
Philosophy magazines
Spanish-language magazines